Heart of a Champion is the  fifth studio album by American rapper Paul Wall. It was released by Warner Bros., Asylum Records and Swishahouse on July 13, 2010.

Background

Guests and production
The album featured production mainly from Houston duo Beanz N Kornbread and Travis Barker, who is part of the group Expensive Taste together with Paul Wall. Guests featuring on the album included rappers Yelawolf, Lil Keke, Jim Jones, Raekwon, Bun B, Chamillionaire, Slim Thug and Devin the Dude. Wall's jewelry business partner Johnny Dang also appeared on the song Heart of a Champion. Wall had a session with The Neptunes but they did not make the final cut.

Critical reception

The album received a 3/5 star rating from XXL. Sean Ryon, editor of HipHopDX gave the album 3 out of 5 stars and said "As flawed as it is, Heart of a Champion is still an album worthy of merit. Paul exhibits a lyrical vigor unheard since his 2005 major label debut. While the album may not be a complete victory, he proves without a doubt that he's still the People's Champ." Ben Detrick of Spin commented this is his best album since his platinum-selling 2005 major-label debut. On the other hand, Jesse Cataldo of Slant Magazine gave Heart of a Champion a 1.5 out of 5, claiming the album "feels like a misguided departure and a lazy retread."

Commercial performance
The album debuted at number 56 on the US Billboard 200 chart, selling 7,600 copies in its first week. It also debuted at number seven on the Billboards Top Rap Albums Chart. In its second week, the album fell to number 124 on the Billboard 200 with total sales of 11,000 copies in the United States. As of January 2011, the album has sold 27,000 copies in the United States.

Track listing

Sample credits
"Smoke Everyday" samples from "The Next Episode" performed by Dr. Dre featuring Snoop Dogg and Nate Dogg

Chart positions

References

Paul Wall albums
Asylum Records albums
Warner Records albums
2010 albums